This is a list of utopian literature. A utopia is a community or society possessing highly desirable or perfect qualities. It is a common literary theme, especially in speculative fiction and science fiction.

Pre-16th century 
The word "utopia" was coined in Greek language by Sir Thomas More for his 1516 book Utopia, but the genre has roots dating back to antiquity.

Assemblywomen (391 BC) by Aristophanes - Early piece of utopian satire. Aristophanes's play mocks Athenian democracy's excesses through the story of the Athenian women taking control of the government and instituting a proto-communist utopia.
The Republic (ca. 370-360 BC) by Plato – One of the earliest conceptions of a utopia.
Laws (360 BC) by Plato
The Republic (ca. 300 BC) by Zeno of Citium, an ideal society based on the principles of Stoicism. 
Sacred History (ca. 300 BC) by Euhemerus – Describes the rational island paradise of Panchaea
Islands of the Sun (ca. 165–50 BC) by Iambulus – Utopian novel describing the features and inhabitants of the title Islands
Life of Lycurgus (ca. 100 BC) by Plutarch
The Peach Blossom Spring (Tao Hua Yuan) (421 CE) by Tao Yuanming
The Virtuous City (Al-Madina al-Fadila) by Al-Farabi (874-950) – A story of Medina as an ideal society ruled by the prophet Muhammad
The Book of the City of Ladies (1404) by Christine de Pizan – the earliest European work on women's history by a woman, and about a utopian city constructed exclusively by women's histories.

16th-17th centuries 
Utopia (1516) by Thomas More.
Wolfaria (1521) by Johann Eberlin von Günzburg – a Lutheran utopia which levied harsh punishments on sinners
La Città felice (1553) by Francesco Patrizi
A Work touching the Good Ordering of a Common Weal (1559) by Joannes Ferrarius Montanus
Siuqila: Too Good to be True (1580) by Thomas Lupton
La Citta del Sole (later published as Civitas solis) (1602) by Tommaso Campanella
Il Belluzzi, o vero della citta felice (1615) by Lodovico Zuccolo
Histoire du grand et admirable royaume d'Antangil (1616) attributed to Jean de Moncy – detailed description of the ordering of the island of Antangil, with a classical republic and multiple checks on power
Christianopolis (Reipublicae Christianopolitanae descriptio) (1619) by Johann Valentin Andreae
The City of the Sun (1623) by Tommaso Campanella – Depicts a theocratic and egalitarian society.
La Repubblica d'Evandria (1625) by Lodovico Zuccolo
New Atlantis (1627) by Sir Francis Bacon
The Man in the Moone (1638) by Francis Godwin
A Description of the Famous Kingdom of Macaria (1641) by Samuel Hartlib
Marcaria (1641) by Gabriel Plattes
Nova Solyma (1648) by Samuel Gott
The Law of Freedom in a Platform (1652) by Gerrard Winstanley – a radical communist vision of an ideal state
Gargantua and Pantagruel (ca. 1653-1694) by François Rabelais
The Commonwealth of Oceana (1656) by James Harrington – a constitutionalist utopian republic in which a balanced allocation of land ensured a balanced government
Comical History of the States and Empires of the Moon (Histoire Comique Contenant les Etats et Empires de la Lune) (1657) by Cyrano de Bergerac
The Blazing World (1666) by Margaret Cavendish – Describes a utopian society in a story mixing science-fiction, adventure, and autobiography.
The Isle of Pines (1668) by Henry Neville – Five people are shipwrecked on an idyllic island in the Southern Hemisphere.
The History of the Sevarites or Sevarambi (1675) by Denis Vairasse
The Southern Land Known (La Terre Australe connue) (1676) by Gabriel de Foigny
Sinapia (1682)
The Adventures of Telemachus (1699) by Francois de Salignac de la Mothe Fenelon

18th century
Robinson Crusoe (1719) by Daniel Defoe
Gulliver's Travels (1726) by Jonathan Swift
The Adventures of Sig. Gaudentio di Lucca (1737) by Simon BeringtonThe Life and Adventures of Peter Wilkins (1751) by Robert PaltockA General Idea of the College of Mirania (1753) by William Smith – Describes a Eutopian educational system. This is the earliest known utopia published in the United States.A Vindication of Natural Society (1756) by Edmund BurkeCandide, ou l'Optimisme (1759) by VoltaireRasselas (1759) by Samuel JohnsonMillenium Hall (1762) by Sarah ScottAn Account of the First Settlement ... of the Cessares (1764) by James BurghMemoirs of the Year Two Thousand Five Hundred (original title: L'An 2440, rêve s'il en fut jamais, which translates literally to The Year 2440: A Dream If Ever There Was One) (1771) by Louis-Sébastien MercierSupplément au voyage de Bougainville (1772) by Denis Diderot – A set of philosophical dialogues written by Denis Diderot, inspired by Louis Antoine de Bougainville's Voyage autour du monde. Diderot presents Bougainville's descriptions of Tahiti as a utopia, standing in contrast to European culture.
 The Adventures of Mr. Nicholas Wisdom (original title: Mikołaja Doświadczyńskiego przypadki) (1776) by Ignacy KrasickiEnquiry Concerning Political Justice (1793) by William GodwinDescription of Spensonia (1795) by Thomas Spence

19th centuryTheory of the Four Movements (1808) by Charles FourierThe Empire of the Nairs (1811) by James Henry LawrenceThe Voyage to Icaria (1842) by Étienne Cabet – Inspired the Icarian movementSibling Life or Brothers and Sisters (1848) by Fredrika BremerVril, the Power of the Coming Race (1871) by Edward Bulwer-Lytton is an utopian novel with a superior subterranean cooperative society.Erewhon (1872) by Samuel Butler – Satirical utopian novel with dystopian elements set in the Southern Alps, New Zealand.Mizora, (1880–81) by Mary E. Bradley LaneA Crystal Age (1887), by W.H. Hudson – An amateur ornithologist and botanist falls down a crevice, and wakes up centuries later, in a world where humans live in families, in harmony with each other and animals; but, where reproduction, emotions, and secondary sexual characteristics are repressed, except for the Alpha males and females.Looking Backward (1888) by Edward BellamyFreeland (1890) by Theodor HertzkaGloriana, or the Revolution of 1900 (1890) by Lady Florence Dixie – The female protagonist poses as a man, Hector l'Estrange, is elected to the House of Commons, and wins women the vote. The book ends in the year 1999, with a description of a prosperous and peaceful Britain governed by women.News from Nowhere (1892) by William Morris – "Nowhere" is a place without politics, a future society based on common ownership and democratic control of the means of production.2894, or The Fossil Man (A Midwinter Night's Dream) (1894) by Walter BrowneA Traveler from Altruria (1894) by William Dean HowellsEquality (1897) by Edward BellamyThe Future State: Production and Consumption in the Socialist State. (Der Zukunftsstaat: Produktion und Konsum im Sozialstaat.) (1898) by Kārlis Balodis – he adopted the pseudonym Ballod-Atlanticus from Bacon's book Nova Atlantis (1627)

 20th-21st centuries NEQUA or The Problem of the Ages by Jack Adams – A feminist utopian science fiction novel printed in Topeka, Kansas in 1900.
 Sultana's Dream (1905) by Begum Rokeya - A Bengali feminist Utopian story about Lady-Land.A Modern Utopia (1905) by H. G. Wells – An imaginary, progressive utopia on a planetary scale in which the social and technological environment are in continuous improvement, a world state owns all land and power sources, positive compulsion and physical labor have been all but eliminated, general freedom is assured, and an open, voluntary order of "samurai" rules.Beatrice the Sixteenth by Irene Clyde – A time traveller discovers a lost world, which is an egalitarian utopian postgender society.Red Star (novel) (1908) Red Star (Russian: Красная звезда) is Alexander Bogdanov's 1908 science fiction novel about a communist society on Mars. The first edition was published in St. Petersburg in 1908, before eventually being republished in Moscow and Petrograd in 1918, and then again in Moscow in 1922.The Millennium: A Comedy of the Year 2000 by Upton Sinclair. A novel in which capitalism finds its zenith with the construction of The Pleasure Palace. During the grand opening of this, an explosion kills everybody in the world except eleven of the people at the Pleasure Palace. The survivors struggle to rebuild their lives by creating a capitalistic society. After that fails, they create a successful utopian society "The Cooperative Commonwealth,"  and live happily forever after.Herland (1915) by Charlotte Perkins Gilman – An isolated society of women who reproduce asexually has established an ideal state that reveres education and is free of war and domination.The New Moon: A Romance of Reconstruction (1918) by Oliver OnionsThe Islands of Wisdom (1922) by Alexander Moszkowski – In the novel various utopian and dystopian islands that embody social-political ideas of European philosophy are explored. The philosophies are taken to their extremes for their absurdities when they are put into practice. It also features an "island of technology" which anticipates mobile telephones, nuclear energy, a concentrated brief-language that saves discussion time and a thorough mechanization of life.Men Like Gods (1923) by H. G. Wells – Men and women in an alternative universe without world government in a perfected state of anarchy ("Our education is our government," a Utopian named Lion says;) sectarian religion, like politics, has died away, and advanced scientific research flourishes; life is governed by "the Five Principles of Liberty," which are privacy, freedom of movement, unlimited knowledge, truthfulness, and freedom of discussion and criticism.Lost Horizon (1933) by James Hilton - The mythical community of Shangri-LaWar with the Newts (1936) by Karel Čapek – Satirical science fiction novel.For Us, The Living: A Comedy of Customs (1938, published in 2003) by Robert A. Heinlein – A futuristic utopian novel explaining practical views on love, freedom, drive, government and economics.Islandia (1942) by Austin Tappan Wright – An imaginary island in the Southern Hemisphere, a utopia containing many Arcadian elements, including a policy of isolation from the outside world and a rejection of industrialism.Walden Two (1948) by B. F. Skinner – A community in which every aspect of living is put to rigorous scientific testing. A professor and his colleagues question the effectiveness of the community started by an eccentric man named T.E. Frazier.Childhood's End (1954) by Arthur C. Clarke – Alien beings guide humanity towards a more economically productive and technologically advanced society, allowing humans to broaden their mental capacities.Island (1962) by Aldous Huxley – Follows the story of Will Farnaby, a cynical journalist, who shipwrecks on the fictional island of Pala and experiences their unique culture and traditions which create a utopian society.
Eutopia (1967) by Poul AndersonThe Dispossessed: An Ambiguous Utopia (1974) by Ursula K. Le Guin - Is set between a pair of planets: one that like Earth today is dominated by private property, nation states, gender hierarchy, and war, and the other an anarchist society without private property.Ecotopia: The Notebooks and Reports of William Weston (1975) by Ernest Callenbach – Ecological utopia in which the Pacific Northwest has seceded from the union to set up a new society.Woman on the Edge of Time (1976) by Marge Piercy – The story of a middle-aged Hispanic woman who has visions of two alternative futures, one utopian and the other dystopian.The Probability Broach (1980) by L. Neil Smith – A libertarian or anarchic utopiaVoyage from Yesteryear (1982) by James P. Hogan – A post-scarcity economy where money and material possessions are meaningless.
Bolo'Bolo (1983) by Hans Widmer published under his pseudonym P.M. – An anarchist utopian world organised in communities of around 500 people Always Coming Home (1985) by Ursula K. Le Guin – A combination of fiction and fictional anthropology about a society in California in the distant future.Pacific Edge (1990) by Kim Stanley Robinson – Set in El Modena, California in 2065, the story describes a transformation process from the late twentieth century to an ecologically sane future.The Fifth Sacred Thing (1993) by Starhawk – A post-apocalyptic novel depicting two societies, one a sustainable economy based on social justice, and its neighbor, a militaristic and intolerant theocracy.3001: The Final Odyssey (1997) by Arthur C. Clarke – Describes human society in 3001 as seen by an astronaut who was frozen for a thousand years. Aria (2001-2008) by Kozue Amano – A manga and anime series set on terraformed version of the planet Mars in the 24th century. The main character, Akari, is a trainee gondolier working in the city of Neo-Venezia, based on modern day Venice.Manna (2003) by Marshall Brain – Essay that explores several issues in modern information technology and user interfaces, including some around transhumanism. Some of its predictions, like the proliferation of automation and AI in the fast food industry, are becoming true years later. Second half of the book describes perfect Utopian society.Uniorder: Build Yourself Paradise (2014), by Joe Oliver. Essay on how to build the Utopia of Thomas More by using computers.The Culture series'' by Iain M. Banks – a science fiction series released from 1987 through 2012. The stories centre on The Culture, a utopian, post-scarcity space society of humanoid aliens, and advanced superintelligent artificial intelligences living in artificial habitats. The main theme is of the dilemmas that an idealistic, more-advanced civilization faces in dealing with smaller, less-advanced civilizations that do not share its ideals, and whose behaviour it sometimes finds barbaric. In some of the stories action takes place mainly in non-Culture environments, and the leading characters are often on the fringes of (or non-members of) the Culture.

See also
 List of dystopian literature

References 

Utopian